Henry Robert Maguire Pigott (2 October 1866 – 8 July 1949) was an Australian politician. He was a member of the Australian House of Representatives from 1913 to 1919, representing the electorate of Calare for the Commonwealth Liberal Party and its successor the Nationalist Party.

He was born in Ceylon of Irish Baptist missionary parents and attended the London School for the Sons of Missionaries. He worked for the Bank of Australasia in England before migrating to New South Wales in 1885. He worked as an official for the Australian Joint Stock Bank in a succession of branches: as an accountant at Summer Hill and then Cooma and then bank manager at Milton and finally Blayney. In 1899, he left the banking industry and became a stock and station agent in Blayney, in which capacity he continued up until his election to parliament. He also purchased a 13,000 acre pastoral property, "Cadara", near Tottenham, in 1910. He was an elected member of the council of the Liberal Association of New South Wales

In 1913, he was elected to the Australian House of Representatives for the Commonwealth Liberal Party, defeating Labour member for Calare Thomas Brown. He held the seat until 1919 (during which time the Liberal Party had become the Nationalist Party), when he was defeated by Labor's Thomas Lavelle. An attempt to regain the seat as a member of the newly formed Country Party in 1922 was unsuccessful.

After his parliamentary defeat, Pigott resided in Blayney while retaining the successful "Cadara" property. He remained active in farming circles, serving as a representative of the Carcoar and Mandurama branch of the Graziers' Association for over twenty years and remaining involved in the Farmers and Settlers Association. He sold "Cadara" in 1945 and purchased a bungalow in the Sydney suburb of Manly, which he lived in thereafter. He died at his Manly home in 1949.

References

External links
The Pigott Family

1866 births
1949 deaths
Commonwealth Liberal Party members of the Parliament of Australia
Nationalist Party of Australia members of the Parliament of Australia
Members of the Australian House of Representatives for Calare
Members of the Australian House of Representatives
Australian people of Irish descent
20th-century Australian politicians
Australian stock and station agents